Afro Blue Impressions is an album of a performance by jazz musician John Coltrane that was recorded live in 1963. The album was originally released many years later, in 1977, on the Pablo label, as a double LP.

Reception
The AllMusic review by Scott Yanow awarded the album 4 stars: "No new revelations occur, but this is a strong all-around set of Trane near his peak."

Reissue
In 2013, the album was re-released under the title Afro Blue Impressions (Remastered and Expanded). This re-release won the Grammy Award for Best Album Notes.

Track listing
All compositions by John Coltrane except as indicated.

Personnel
 John Coltrane — tenor saxophone, soprano saxophone
 McCoy Tyner — piano
 Jimmy Garrison — double bass
 Elvin Jones — drums

References

External links

Albums produced by Norman Granz
John Coltrane live albums
1977 live albums
Pablo Records live albums
Live hard bop albums
Live modal jazz albums
Live avant-garde jazz albums
Live albums published posthumously